If We Could Only See Us Now is a dual disc release by American rock band Thrice, and has been certified Gold by the RIAA in the "music video longform" category with sales in excess of 50,000. The first disc is a CD of rarities including unreleased songs. The second disc is a documentary of the band on DVD which covers their career from their founding up through the release of their album The Artist In The Ambulance.

Track listing
 "Eclipse" – 3:21
 "Motion Isn't Meaning" – 1:53
 "Stare At The Sun" (Acoustic) – 3:41
 "Cold Cash, Colder Hearts" (Live At the Apple Store) – 3:03
 "The Artist in the Ambulance" (Live At The Apple Store) – 3:47
 "Eleanor Rigby" (Beatles cover) – 3:51
 "Send Me An Angel" (Real Life cover)– 3:27
 "That Hideous Strength" – 2:30
 "So Strange I Remember You" (Alternative version/Live bootleg from PNC Bank Arts Center) – 4:18

Personnel
 Dave Gorum & Nick Bogardus - direction
 Brandon Clarke - executive producer
 Robert Stevenson - A&R
 Andy Wallace - mixing
 Brian McTernan - producer, engineer
 Matt Squire - assistant engineer
 Bill Synan - assistant engineer
 Richard Locke - lighting
 Thrice - re-arranged
 Dave Gorum - graphic design
 Teppei Teranishi - producer, mixing, engineer
 Blake Beynon - drawing
 Kelly Butler - engineer
 Michael Barbiero - producer
 Charlie Barnett - arranger, conductor
 David Berman - photography
 Jade Kuei - video footage

References

Thrice albums
2005 live albums
2005 compilation albums
2005 video albums
Documentary films about punk music and musicians
Island Records compilation albums
Island Records live albums
Island Records video albums
Albums produced by Brian McTernan